Smoky Night is a 1994 children's book by Eve Bunting. It tells the story of a Los Angeles riot and its aftermath through the eyes of a young boy named Daniel. The ongoing fires and looting force neighbors who previously disliked each other to work together to find their cats. In the end, the cats teach their masters how to get along. The book made the list of One Hundred Books that Shaped the Century compiled by the Staff at the School Library Journal.  They added the book to the list as paving the way towards the genre of serious picture books. David Diaz's acrylic, collage-like illustration of the tale earned the book the 1995 Caldecott Medal.

Plot 
Riots and commotion are happening around Los Angeles, where Daniel and his mother live. The family is forced to leave their apartment when the building catches fire. After all the racism and judgement happening and not getting along with their neighbor, they must come together and put their differences aside. In the upheaval, their cat and a neighbor's cat are lost. Once they get to the shelter where they were staying at, a fireman brings their cats, who have bonded over their experience.

References

1994 children's books
Caldecott Medal–winning works
Books about cats
American picture books
Books about race and ethnicity